Zavadil (feminine Zavadilová) is a Czech surname. Notable people with the surname include:

 Lenka Zavadilová (born 1975), Czech rower
 Pavel Zavadil (born 1978), Czech footballer
 Peter Zavadil, American music video director
 Radek Zavadil (born 1973), Czech rower

Czech-language surnames